Forrest Docenus "Woody" Jensen (August 11, 1907 – October 5, 2001) was a professional baseball player who played professional baseball from 1931 to 1939 as an outfielder. His record of 696 at bats in 1936 was not broken until Matty Alou broke it in 1969. Jensen played all of his career with the Pittsburgh Pirates. 

In 738 games over nine seasons, Jensen posted a .285 batting average (774-for-2720) with 392 runs, 114 doubles, 37 triples, 26 home runs, 235 RBI, 69 bases on balls, .307 on-base percentage and .382 slugging percentage.

References 

1907 births
2001 deaths
Major League Baseball outfielders
Pittsburgh Pirates players
Baseball players from Washington (state)
Wichita State Shockers baseball coaches